The 1964 Campeonato Ecuatoriano de Fútbol was the 6th national championship for football teams in Ecuador. Deportivo Quito won their first national title, becoming the first club from the capital city to win. They qualified to the 1965 Copa Libertadores.

Qualified teams
The number of teams remained the same at eight. The qualified teams included the top-four finishers from the Campeonato Interandino, two teams from Manabí, and two from Tungurahua. América de Ambato, América de Manta, El Nacional, and Juventud Italiana made their first appearance in the national tournament. Teams from Guayaquil declined to participate.

Standings

Results

Playoff
Since points was the sole deciding factor in determining the champion, Deportivo Quito, El Nacional, and LDU Quito went to a playoff. The matches took place the following year in 1965.

Standings

Results

References

Ecuadorian Serie A seasons
1964 in Ecuadorian sport
Ecu